Ruslan Vladimirovich Pashtov (born 28 November 1992) is a Russian professional footballer. He plays for FC Forte Taganrog.

Club career
He made his professional debut in the Russian Premier League on 1 October 2011 for FC Volga Nizhny Novgorod in a game against FC Amkar Perm.

References

External links
 

1992 births
Sportspeople from Nalchik
Living people
Russian footballers
Russia youth international footballers
Association football midfielders
FC Dynamo Moscow reserves players
Russian Premier League players
FC Volga Nizhny Novgorod players
FC Sokol Saratov players
PFC Spartak Nalchik players
FC Avangard Kursk players
FC Dynamo Saint Petersburg players
FC Khimik Dzerzhinsk players
FC Ararat Moscow players